The name Hettie has been used for three tropical storms in the South Pacific Ocean.

 Severe Tropical Storm Hettie (1982)
 Cyclone Hettie (1992)
 Tropical Cyclone Hettie (2009)